"I Need My Girl" is a song written by Matt Berninger, Aaron Dessner, Bryce Dessner, Bryan Devendorf and Scott Devendorf of the American alternative rock band The National. The song was originally recorded by the band in 2013 for their sixth studio album, Trouble Will Find Me, where it appears as the tenth track. An "I Need My Girl" promotional single was released to European radio in November 2013, American radio in January 2014 and British radio in March 2014, becoming the fifth release by the band in promotion of Trouble Will Find Me. The song has featured in the movie Entourage and on episodes of the television shows The Mindy Project and You.

Track listings

Personnel

The National
Matt Berninger - lead vocals
Aaron Dessner - rhythm guitar, keyboards, vibraphone, harmonica
Bryce Dessner - lead guitar, keyboards, e-bow, orchestration
Bryan Devendorf - drums, percussion
Scott Devendorf - bass guitar

Recording personnel

Artwork
Randall J Lane - Artwork (Ballads)
Lafont London - design
Distant Station Ltd. - design

Charts

Release history

Commercial

Promotional

References

The National (band) songs
2013 singles
2013 songs
4AD singles
Rock ballads
Songs written by Matt Berninger
Songs written by Aaron Dessner
Songs written by Bryce Dessner
Song recordings produced by Aaron Dessner
Song recordings produced by Bryce Dessner